Tom Snout is a character in William Shakespeare's A Midsummer Night's Dream. He is a tinker, and one of the "mechanicals" of Athens, amateur players in Pyramus and Thisbe, a play within the play.

In the play-within-a-play, Tom Snout plays the wall which separates Pyramus' and Thisbe's gardens. In Pyramus and Thisbe, the two lovers whisper to each other through Snout's fingers (representing a gap in the wall). Snout has eight lines under the name of Tom Snout, and two lines as The Wall. He is the Wall for Act V-Scene 1.

Tom Snout was originally set to play Pyramus's father, but the need for a wall was greater, so he discharged The Wall. Snout is often portrayed as a reluctant actor and very frightened, but the other mechanicals (except Nick Bottom and Peter Quince) are usually much more frightened than Tom Snout).

Snout's name, like that of the other mechanicals, is a metonym and derives from his craft: "Snout" means a nozzle or a spout, a feature of the kettles a tinker often mends.

References

Sources

Fictional artisans
Fictional actors
Male Shakespearean characters
Characters in A Midsummer Night's Dream
Literary characters introduced in 1596
Fictional Greek people
Fictional mechanics